Abhimani may refer to:

 The name of Agni in the Vishnu Purana
 Abhimani, a 2009 Indian Kannada film
 Abhimani Film Festival in Colombo, Sri Lanka, the oldest LGBTIQ film festival in South Asia
 Yare Nee Abhimani, a 2000 Indian Kannada film